This is a timeline of sociology. Each entry lists important works published during that decade.

 1810s in sociology
 1820s in sociology
 1830s in sociology
 1840s in sociology
 1850s in sociology
 1860s in sociology
 1870s in sociology
 1880s in sociology
 1890s in sociology
 1900s in sociology
 1910s in sociology
 1920s in sociology
 1930s in sociology
 1940s in sociology
 1950s in sociology
 1960s in sociology
 1970s in sociology
 1980s in sociology
 1990s in sociology
 2000s in sociology
 2010s in sociology

See also
 History of sociology